For reasons of size, the results are divided into twenty-year periods:

Switzerland national football team results (1905–1918)
Switzerland national football team results (1920–1939)
Switzerland national football team results (1940–1959)
Switzerland national football team results (1960–1979)
Switzerland national football team results (1980–1999)
Switzerland national football team results (2000–2009)
Switzerland national football team results (2010–2019)
Switzerland national football team results (2020–present)

Switzerland national football team